The 4th FINA Synchronised Swimming World Cup was held September 7–9, 1989 in Paris, France. It featured swimmers from 10 nations, swimming in three events: Solo, Duet and Team.

Participating nations
10 nations swam at the 1989 Synchro World Cup:

Results

Point standings

References

FINA Synchronized Swimming World Cup
1989 in synchronized swimming
International aquatics competitions hosted by France
1989 in French sport
Synchronized swimming competitions in France